McKim's School, also known as McKim's Free School, is a historic school located at Baltimore, Maryland, United States. It is an archaeologically accurate Greek-style building. The front façade is designed after the Temple of Hephaestus, or Temple of Theseus, in Athens, Greece in granite. The sides were derived from the north wing of the Propylaia on the Acropolis of Athens. The building site was funded by Quaker merchant Jon McKim who funded a trust for poor students managed by his son Isaac after his death in 1819. It was designed by Baltimore architects William Howard and William Small and erected in 1833. It served as a school and youth training center until 1945, when the building was adapted for use as the McKim Community Center. In 1972 the building was sold by trustees to the city.

McKim's School was listed on the National Register of Historic Places in 1973.

It is included in the Baltimore Heritage Walk.

References

External links

, including photo from 1997, at Maryland Historical Trust
McKim Community Association, Inc., website
Explore Baltimore Heritage - McKim's Free School

Defunct schools in Maryland
Buildings and structures in Baltimore
Jonestown, Baltimore
School buildings on the National Register of Historic Places in Baltimore
Greek Revival architecture in Maryland
School buildings completed in 1833
Baltimore City Landmarks